Seoul Grand Park Station is a station on Line 4 of the Seoul Subway network.

A shuttle bus from the station runs to the Seoul Museum of Modern Art and the upper entrance to Seoul Grand Park.

Station layout

References

Seoul Metropolitan Subway stations
Railway stations opened in 1994
Metro stations in Gwacheon